Bucculatrix verax is a moth in the family Bucculatricidae. It is found in India. The species was described in 1918 by Edward Meyrick.

The larvae feed on Trewia nudiflora.

References

Bucculatricidae
Moths described in 1918
Taxa named by Edward Meyrick
Moths of Asia